{{Infobox football club
| clubname  = Santos FC 
| image     =  
| fullname  = Santos Futebol Clube Reserves and Academy 
| nickname  = Peixe (Fish)Santástico (Santastic)Clube do povo (Club of the people)
| founded   = 
| ground    = Vila Belmiro, SantosCT Meninos da Vila, Santos
| capacity  = 16,068
| manager   = U20: Orlando RibeiroU17: Élder Campos
| league    = U20: Copa SP de JúniorU20: U20: Campeonato Brasileiro
| season    = 202320222022
| position  = U20: Copa SP de Júnior, 4th of 128U20: , 1st of 72U20: Campeonato Brasileiro, 9th of 20
| pattern_la1 = _santos22h
| pattern_b1 = _santos22h
| pattern_ra1 = _santos22h
| pattern_sh1 = _santos21h
| pattern_so1 = _santos21h
| leftarm1 = FFFFFF
| body1 = FFFFFF
| rightarm1 = FFFFFF
| shorts1 = FFFFFF
| socks1 = FFFFFF
| pattern_la2 = _santos22a
| pattern_b2 = _santos22a
| pattern_ra2 = _santos22a
| pattern_sh2 = _santos21a
| pattern_so2 = _santos21a
| leftarm2 = FFFFFF
| body2 = 000000
| rightarm2 = FFFFFF
| shorts2 = 000000
| socks2 = 000000
| pattern_la3 = _santos21t
| pattern_b3 = _santos21t
| pattern_ra3 = _santos21t
| pattern_sh3 = _santos21t
| pattern_so3 = _santos21tl
| leftarm3 = 1C1F29
| body3 = 1C1F29
| rightarm3 = 1C1F29
| shorts3 = 1C1F29
| socks3 = 1C1F29
}}

The Santos Futebol Clube Reserves and Academy consist of the reserve and academy teams of Santos FC. Its main goal is to discover talented young players who has future potential to play for Santos' first team.

Structure
Santos Futebol Clube is responsible for over 100 young athletes in 5 different categories: U-11, U-13, U-15, U-17, U-20. These athletes stay in two modern dormitories, located inside Urbano Caldeira Stadium, with living room, recreation room and cafeteria. The athletes also have medical, dental and psychological assistance. The club’s physical development program is a pioneer within Brazilian soccer.

The club developed the Centro de Desenvolvimento à Performance ao Futebol (Center of Football Performance Development) to set a pattern in physical preparation for all youth teams. This project starts with boys over six years old and covers 270 young athletes.

The gymnasium used by youth teams is located on the third floor at Vila Belmiro Stadium, and it is equipped with technology similar to that available for Santos’ first team.  Education is valued by the team, leading it to create the Centro de Estudos Luiza Neófiti (Luiza Neófiti Study Center) adjacent to the gym.

Notable academy graduates
2000s
From the squad who was crowned champions in 2002, Santos had 15 youth graduates (Rafael, Alex, André Luís, Michel, Pereira, Preto, Leandro, Canindé, Diego, Paulo Almeida, Adiel, Douglas, Robinho, William and Bruno Moraes) who appeared with the side over the year.

In 2003, with the club finishing second, another academy products appeared regularly with the first team. As Robinho, Alex, André Luís, Paulo Almeida and Diego were already starters, Jerri was the newcomer more regularly used during the year, mainly as a substitute.

In 2004 – another season of success – Domingos, Leonardo and Luís Augusto appeared regularly and were the main youth graduates of the year. After a vast majority of the players left the club and moved to Europe (the most notable sale was Robinho's to Real Madrid in 2005), the club struggled to produce any notable graduates in the following three years.

Santos’ first team for the 2007 and 2008 seasons included players such as Renatinho, Felipe, Marcelo, Adriano, Carlinhos, Thiago Carleto, Díonísio and Moraes; the latter scored the winner in 2007 Campeonato Paulista.

2010s
In the 2010 season's astronomic campaign, Santos had Neymar, Ganso, André, Alan Patrick, Rafael and Robinho as their notable youth graduates (despite the latter and André left in June). In the following two years, the club saw the emergence of Neymar as a rising star and also saw some youth graduates like Felipe Anderson and Victor Andrade stepping up and becoming first-team regulars for the side.

In 2013, a complete revolution took over the club after Neymar's transfer to FC Barcelona; former youth sides' manager Claudinei Oliveira was promoted to first-team, and gave first-team football to Alan Santos, Leandrinho, Neílton, Giva, Emerson Palmieri, Gustavo Henrique and Alison, with the latter two impressing in the season. A year later, the club's youth emergence followed, with Geuvânio, Gabriel and Jubal also being in the spotlights.

In 2015, the club's youth graduates again appeared strongly in the main squad, with Daniel Guedes, Zeca and Thiago Maia becoming regulars, mainly under Dorival Júnior. In 2016, the first graduates from the B-team started to appear in the main squad, with Lucas Veríssimo, Ronaldo Mendes and Vitor Bueno being the players more regularly used. Although Ronaldo left in the summer, Bueno was elected the Newcomer of the year's Brasileirão'' after scoring ten goals.

During the 2017 season, the promoted players from the under-20s were Arthur Gomes and Matheus Oliveira, while Yan and Thaciano came from the B-side; none of them were regularly used, however. Late in the season, prospects like Yuri Alberto and Rodrygo went straight to the main squad from the under-17s.

In 2018, Rodrygo came into prominence after becoming a regular starter for the club. Youth graduates like Robson Bambu, Gabriel Calabres, Guilherme Nunes and Matheus Guedes were all promoted from the under-20s, while Diego Pituca came from the B-team. Another youth team players like Victor Yan, Lucas Lourenço and Emerson featured on the bench for some matches, but were later demoted back to their youth sides. Late in the year, Kaio Jorge, a forward from the under-17s, was promoted to the first team.

On 16 October 2018, Santos' board opted to cease the activity of the B-team for the 2019 season. During the 2019 campaign, the youth setup had little protagonism in the first team's performance, with only Gustavo Henrique, Lucas Veríssimo and Alison featuring regularly; all of them, however, were already involved in the main squad in the past seasons. Wagner Leonardo, Sandry and Tailson were the only youth graduates to make their first team debuts in that season.

2020s
For the 2020 season under Jesualdo Ferreira, more youth graduates were involved in the first team routines, with Kaio Jorge establishing himself as a regular and Renyer making his first team debut. Jesualdo also promoted Ivonei, Anderson Ceará and Alex, while also taking Marcos Leonardo up for trainings.

After Jesualdo left and Cuca was appointed manager, Ângelo made his debut as a 15-year-old, becoming the second-youngest player to debut in the club's history. Sandry became a regular starter, while João Paulo and John shared the starting spot. The club also reached the 2020 Copa Libertadores Final, where five youth graduates took part of the club's starting eleven (John, Veríssimo, Alison, Sandry and Kaio Jorge) and another two came in as substitutes (Wellington Tim and Bruno Marques), while the club had 12 players who played for the youth categories among the 23-man matchday squad.

For the 2021 campaign, new manager Ariel Holan gave the starting spot to Ângelo, Kaiky and Gabriel Pirani, with Kevin Malthus and Vinicius Balieiro being also regularly used. After Holan resigned, only Pirani featured regularly under subsequent managers Fernando Diniz and Fábio Carille.

During the 2022 season, Ângelo, Kaiky, Marcos Leonardo and Lucas Pires became regular starters at the club; Lucas Barbosa and Rwan Seco also started to feature in the main squad.

Honours
 : 2014
 Copa São Paulo de Juniores: 1984, 2013, 2014
 Copa do Brasil Sub-20: 2013
 : 2011
 Porto Seguro Cup: 2008
 : 1979, 2007, 2008, 2012, 2022
 : 1994, 2001, 2004, 2010, 2014
 : 2009
 : 2006, 2008, 2009, 2010, 2014, 2015
 : 2011, 2012, 2013, 2019
 Supercopa Eurofarma de Futebol Júnior: 2010

Players

B team
Created in 2015 as Santos under-23 squad, the side acted mainly as a transition between the under-20 to the professional team. The B-team played in the Copa Paulista, before being disbanded in 2020.

In 2021, Santos again played in the Copa Paulista, but with the same team which played in the Campeonato Brasileiro de Aspirantes, mainly composed by under-20 players.

Other players under contract

Under-20 squad
According to the official website.

Current technical staff

Manager history

Under-20 squad

 Márcio Fernandes (2003–2008)
 Narciso (2008–2011)
 Claudinei Oliveira (2011–2013)
 Pepinho (2013–2015)
 Emerson Ballio (2015)
 Marcos Soares (2015–2017)
 Aarão Alves (2017–2018)
 Emerson Ballio (2019)
 Márcio Zanardi (2019)
 Pablo Fernandez (2020)
 Aarão Alves (2020–2021)
 Rodrigo Chipp (2021)
 Thiago Lima (caretaker; 2021)
 Élder Campos (2022)
 Orlando Ribeiro (2022–)
 Buião (caretaker; 2022)

Academy graduates
Only players who made their senior debuts for Santos in the 21st century are listed;
Note: Academy graduates who still play for Santos, including those that are currently out on loan to other clubs, are highlighted in green. Players who have appeared for another senior team before making their first team debut with Santos are highlighted in italic.

References

External links
Santos FC's Júnior squad on official website 

Reserves and Academy
Football academies in Brazil